William Li (born November 25, 1989), better known as Scarra, is an American Twitch streamer and former professional League of Legends player. He is most well known for being the mid laner for Team Dignitas. Li is a co-founder of OfflineTV, an online social entertainment group of content creators.

Early life 
Li attended Texas A&M University, but dropped out in 2012.

Career

League of Legends

Season 1 
Li started playing League of Legends after its official release. He started to get attention from Locust which he knew from World of Warcraft. He, Rambo, Th3Rat, Naryt, Voyboy and Araragi together created a team to compete in 2010 Newegg Winter Winfest tournament but lost in the tournament.

Li signed with Team Dignitas prior to the start of the inaugural League of Legends Championship Series season.

On October 9, 2011, Li and his team defeated Epik Gamer 2–1 in the IGN Proleague Season 3 - Atlantic City.

Li was able to place third in the IEM Season VI - Global Challenge Kyiv but was defeated in the semifinals.

At the LoLPro.com Curse Invitational in San Francisco, Scarra and Team Dignitas took the grand prize of $20,000.

Li attended IEM Season VI - World Championship in Hanover.

Season 2 
While on the way back to the United States, Li attended IGN Proleague Season 4 - Las Vegas on April 6, 2012. His team was able to defeat Monomaniac 2-1 and Counter Logic Gaming Prime, 2–1 in the second round. Team Dignitas fell short 2–1 against Team SoloMid and were ultimately eliminated by Counter Logic Gaming Prime 2–0.

On June 6, 2012, Li attended the MLG Pro Circuit - Spring Championship with a newly reformed Dignitas, having Voyboy be replaced by Crumbzz. Scarra and Team Dignitas defeated Team Green Forest, Team Dynamic, and Counter Logic Gaming Prime. They lost to Team SoloMid, which they encountered Counter Logic Gaming Prime and lost 2–0, taking home third place.

Li and Team Dignitas participated in 2012 MLG Summer Championship. They originally finished second place in the tournament, but would later be disqualified after MLG determined that there was collusion between Dignitas and the first place team, Curse NA. At the Season Two North American Regionals, they also finished second, losing to Team SoloMid in the finals.

Season 3 
Li and his team attended Season 3 League Championship Series. They finished in third place.

The Season 3 LCS Spring Playoffs took place in April, with Li and his team were sent to the relegation at the Season 3 LCS Summer Promotion. Team Dignitas was able to defeat Team Summon 3-1 and ensure their spot in the summer season.

His team also competed in the 2013 MLG Winter Championship. They went against Gambit Gaming, but lost 2–0.

In April 2013, Li was publicly voted as the NA LCS mid-lane All-Star, which allowed him to play for the North America LCS team and compete in All-Star Shanghai 2013. They lost against China LPL, 2–0. They went on to win against Europe LCS by 2–0. After winning against Europe LCS, they went on to play against Korean OGN Champions and lost 2–0.

Season 4 
On December 10, CLG was fined $10,000 by Riot for poaching Li from Dignitas. Additionally, Scarra would be banned from serving the position of being CLG's head coach for the first three weeks of the spring LCS. Scarra played for CLG Black in the summer season qualifier, but after defeating Maelstrom, they were forced to substituted out AD carry Stixxay for Frost and then lost to both Cloud9 Tempest and Magnetic, missing out on the NACS summer season.

Return to Twitch & OfflineTV 
Following his retirement from the League of Legends Championship series, Li made his return to Twitch as a full-time content creator. In June 2017, Li joined Echo Fox's League of Legends Challenger Series team Delta Fox as a midlaner. He would leave two months later, joining Meme Stream Dream Team, a team formed by Delta Fox's former roster. The Dream Team played in three exhibition tournaments: The Tyler1 Championship Series in 2017 and 2018 along with a "showmatch" at the 2018 NA LCS finals.

In July 2017, he and his then-manager, Chris Chan, founded OfflineTV, an online social entertainment group based in Los Angeles, California. Speaking on the origins of the group, Li stated "I think I just wanted to live with friends. That was the origin of it. I wanted to live with people and make cool stuff with other people. It was myself and my manager Chris who started this idea. It just led to where it is today. I can’t say that there was a formula we followed. We faced a lot of problems along the way. However, thanks to these problems, I feel like we came out stronger.

In 2019, Li was one of the most watched Teamfight Tactics streamers following the game's release in June, averaging 7,000 viewers. He also completed a streaming challenge where he streamed every day for the entire year.

Select competitions

League of Legends

Awards and nominations

See also 
Imaqtpie
Disguised Toast
Pokimane

References 

  Text was copied from scarra at GamePedia, which is released under a Creative Commons Attribution-Share Alike 3.0 (Unported) (CC-BY-SA 3.0) license.

1989 births
Living people
American people of Chinese descent
People from Houston
Dignitas (esports) players
American esports players
League of Legends mid lane players
Twitch (service) streamers
League of Legends coaches